Ai Xiaoming (born 1953) is a Chinese documentary filmmaker and political activist. She is also a scholar of women's and public issues, and former professor at Sun Yat-sen University. Ai was born in Wuhan in 1953, and has spent most of her adult life in Beijing and Guangzhou.

Ai Xiaoming and Guo Jianmei won the 2010 Simone de Beauvoir Prize for Women's Freedom.

Scholarship and activism
In 1985, Ai became a professor at Beijing Normal University. From 1994 to 2014, she taught at Sun Yat-sen University, focusing on literature and women's studies. In her early career, Ai was an accomplished writer and translator, writing several books on literature and translating the works of Milan Kundera, as well as editing others.

In 2000, she visited America as a researcher on Women and Gender studies. In 2009, she was prevented from attending a Chinese Documentary Film Festival in Hong Kong, due to concerns about her personal safety resulting from her political film-making activities.

Ai has criticised the Chinese government's national policy of compulsory IUDs for women who have already given birth to a child. She has said that many women, herself included, had never been advised of potential complications and the requirement for regular checkups.

in 2013, Ai protested topless on twitter and outside a Hainan school in response to the rape of six students by the school's principal and a local official. She was jailed the same day for defending herself with a kitchen knife against attackers who came to her home. She stated that her nude protest was inspired by Ai Weiwei.

Ai's films are banned in China.

Filmography
Since 2004, she has made more than two dozen films, including documentaries about citizen activism, social problems, and corruption. Some of her films aim to uncover whitewashed historical events.

References

External links 
 Zeng, Jinyan. "The Politics of Emotion in Grassroots Feminist Protests: A Case Study of Xiaoming Ai's Nude Breasts Photography Protest Online." Georgetown Journal of International Affairs, vol. 15, no. 1, 2014, pp. 41–52. JSTOR, . Accessed 26 Feb. 2021.
 

Living people
Chinese filmmakers
Chinese women film directors
Chinese women academics
Chinese documentary film directors
1953 births
Academic staff of Beijing Normal University
Academic staff of Sun Yat-sen University
Writers from Wuhan
Film directors from Hubei
Women documentary filmmakers